(born June 5, 1954) is a Japanese actress. She was nominated for Best Supporting Actress at the 17th Japan Academy Prize for her role in Bloom in the Moonlight. Her father is the novelist Kazuo Dan and she herself has won awards for her essays.

Filmography

Film
 Brutal Tales of Chivalry 9 (1972) – Oyuki
 Tora's Pure Love (1976) – Masako Yagyū
 House (1977) – Teacher
 Ashita no Joe (1980) (voice) – Yōko Shiraki
 Ashita no Joe 2 (1981) (voice) – Yōko Shiraki
 House on Fire (1986) – Kazuo's mother
 Tora-san, My Uncle (1989) – Hisako Okumura
 Bloom in the Moonlight (1993) – Nobu Kōda
 Farewell to Nostradamus (1996) (voice) – Mary Douglas
 After the Rain (1999) – Nobleman's wife
 Kamachi (2004) – Yōko Kanno
 Climbing to Spring (2014) – Sumire Nagamine
 Leaving the Scene (2019) – Chizuko
 The Zen Diary (2022)
 Sun and Bolero (2022) – Yoriko Hanamura

Television
 Yasashii Jidai (1978) – Yōko Matsui
 Haru no Hatō (1985) – Fusako Fukuzawa
 Hana no Ran (1994) – Mori
 Hana Moyu (2015) – Sugi Taki
 Toto Neechan (2016) – Narrator
 Rikuoh (2017) – Mieko Miyazawa

Awards

References

External links 
 
 Interview at Gentosha 

1954 births
People from Nerima
Actresses from Tokyo
Japanese essayists
Japanese film actresses
Living people
Writers from Tokyo
20th-century Japanese actresses
21st-century Japanese actresses